Evergestis merceti is a species of moth in the family Crambidae. It is found in Spain.

The wingspan is 29–31 mm. Adults are on wing from September to October.

The larvae probably feed on Biscutella species.

References

Moths described in 1933
Evergestis
Moths of Europe